Natural polyphenols molecular formulas represent a class of natural aromatic organic compounds in which one or more hydroxy groups are attached directly to the benzene ring, generally formed from C, H and O.

The entries are sorted by mass.

References

Polyphenols
Dictionary
Dictionary